Zhang Shujing (born September 13, 1978 in Baicheng, Jilin province) is a Chinese long-distance runner.

She finished twelfth in the marathon at the 2004 Olympic Games and the 2003 World Championships. She also won the Asian Marathon Championships in 2002 and 2004.

Her personal best times are 15:34.54 minutes over 5000 metres (2001), 1:12:46 hours in the half marathon (2003) and 2:23:17 hours in the marathon (2002).

Achievements
All results regarding marathon, unless stated otherwise

References

External links

marathoninfo

1978 births
Living people
Chinese female long-distance runners
Chinese female marathon runners
Athletes (track and field) at the 2004 Summer Olympics
Athletes (track and field) at the 2008 Summer Olympics
Olympic athletes of China
People from Baicheng
Runners from Jilin